Kornai is a surname. Notable people with the surname include:

Josef (József) Kornai (1889–1989), Hungarian painter
János Kornai (Kornhauser) (1928-2021), Jewish Hungarian economist, noted for his analysis and criticism of the command economies of Eastern European communist states
András Kornai (born 1957), Hungarian mathematical linguist
Kornai-Liptak Decomposition

Hungarian-language surnames